Giovanni Domenico Campiglia (1692–1768) was an Italian painter and engraver from Florence, active under the patronage of the House of Medici.

He initially trained under Tommaso Redi and Lorenzo del Moro, then in Bologna under Giovanni Gioseffo dal Sole. During his career, Campiglia was employed in Rome and Florence, painting and engraving historical subjects and portraits. Campiglia worked with Antonio Francesco Gori for over a decade on the Museum Florentinum, a collection of images of all the famous artists of Florence. Campiglia's contributions were published in 1734, which induced Pope Clement XII to bring him to Rome. There he worked with historian Giovanni Gaetano Bottari in engravings for his multi-volume Musei Capitolini. His highly finished drawings of antique and famous statues of Rome were highly prized by British tourists.

Sources
 National Gallery of Scotland, Biography of Campiglia.

1692 births
1768 deaths
18th-century Italian painters
Italian male painters
Painters from Florence
Italian Baroque painters
Italian engravers
18th-century Italian male artists